Benjamin Schüßler (born 4 May 1981 in Magdeburg, East Germany) is a German footballer who plays for SV Hönnepel-Niedermörmter.

Career
He made his debut on the professional league level in the 2. Bundesliga for VfL Osnabrück on 3 August 2003, when he started a game against LR Ahlen.

References

1981 births
Living people
German footballers
1. FC Magdeburg players
Borussia Mönchengladbach players
Borussia Mönchengladbach II players
VfL Osnabrück players
SC Paderborn 07 players
Rot-Weiß Oberhausen players
Sportspeople from Magdeburg
2. Bundesliga players
3. Liga players
Association football midfielders
Footballers from Saxony-Anhalt